The 1923 Centenary Gentlemen football team represented the Centenary College of Louisiana as a member of the Louisiana Intercollegiate Athletic Association (LIAA)  during the 1923 college football season. Led by second-year head coach Bo McMillin, the Gentlemen compiled an overall record of 10–2.

Schedule

References

Centenary
Centenary Gentlemen football seasons
Centenary Gentlemen football